Al-Marrakushi is a small, relatively isolated lunar impact crater in the eastern Mare Fecunditatis. It is a circular, symmetrical formation, with inner walls that slope down to the midpoint. To the northeast is the prominent crater Langrenus. The mare near Al-Marrakushi is marked by ray material from its larger neighbor.

This crater was identified as Langrenus D until it was given a name by the IAU in 1976. It was named after Ibn al-Banna al-Marrakushi (c. 1256 – c. 1321).

References

External links
 

Impact craters on the Moon